The Eastern Illinois Panthers men's basketball team is the basketball team that represents Eastern Illinois University in Charleston, Illinois, United States. The first basketball team started in 1908–09 season. The school's team currently competes in the Ohio Valley Conference. The Panthers competed in the NCAA Division I tournament in 1992 and 2001.

Season Results
Eastern Illinois' records season by season since joining Division I in 1981.

Postseason

NCAA Division I tournament results
The Panthers have appeared in the NCAA Division I tournament two times. Their combined record is 0–2.

NCAA Division II tournament results
The Panthers have appeared in the NCAA Division II tournament six times. Their combined record is 10–7.

NAIA tournament results
The Panthers have appeared in the NAIA tournament six times. Their combined record is 7–7.

CIT results
The Panthers have appeared in the CollegeInsider.com Postseason Tournament (CIT) one time. Their record is 1–1.

Retired Numbers

Notable former players
 Jon Collins, EIU Hall of Fame 1993
 Henry Domercant, former professional basketball player in Europe
 Kevin Duckworth, former NBA all-star center 
 Kyle Hill, former professional basketball player
 Alfonzo McKinnie, NBA player for the Chicago Bulls
 Jay Taylor, former NBA player for the New Jersey Nets

See also
NCAA Division I men's basketball tournament bids by school
List of NCAA Division II men's basketball tournament bids by school

References

External links